Black Blade may refer to:

 Black Blade (novel), a novel by Eric Van Lustbader
 "Black Blade" (song), a song by Blue Öyster Cult